The roots of Central India Theological Seminary go back to 1962 when Dr. Kurien Thomas founded Bharosa Bible College at Itarsi, Central India. It was later renamed as Central India Bible College and then raised to a research institution in 1999 with the name Central India Theological Seminary by Dr. Matthew K. Thomas. The seminary provides residential theological education at both undergraduate and post-graduate levels in English and Hindi. The Dr. Kurien Thomas Study and Research Center at Central India Theological Seminary initiated the Master of Theology program in Christian Apologetics in 2013. The Seminary began its Distance Education department in 2010. The Seminary offers courses accredited by Asia Theological Association.

The Seminary's Study Block has a library section, classrooms, and offices. Men's Hostel and Women's Hostel occupy separate blocks. The Seminary has on campus Staff Quarters and Guest Quarters as well occupying separate blocks of buildings.

The Convocation of the Seminary is held on Friday during the General Fellowship Convention of Churches and Leaders every year at Itarsi.

See also
Kurien Thomas
Fellowship of the Pentecostal Churches in India

References

External links

Christianity in Madhya Pradesh
Pentecostalism in Asia
Christian seminaries and theological colleges in India
Seminaries and theological colleges